The Jamaica Times was a literary newspaper for literature from Jamaica and the Caribbean. The author Thomas MacDermot (aka Tom Redcam) was the editor from 1900 to 1920 and was an assistant before that, and the author Herbert George de Lisser was an editor for several years starting in 1889. It was a weekly paper primarily for teachers and ministers but also for a wide spectrum of the middle classes.

Editors
Herbert George de Lisser, 1889
Thomas MacDermot, 1900–1920

External links
 Herbert G. de Lisser at the Jamaica Times
 Thomas MacDermot's role as editor of the Jamaica Times
 Original issues of the Jamaica Times openly and freely accessible for all within the Digital Library of the Caribbean

Jamaican literature
Newspapers published in Jamaica